The Silsila Azeemia  (commonly known as the Azeemi Spiritual Sufi Order) is a Muslim Sufi order based in Pakistan with a following in the UK, the US, Austria, Serbia, Russia, Australia, Canada & various countries of the Middle East. The tariqa was started by Qalandar Baba Auliya also known as Syed Muhammad Azeem Barkhia (1898–1979). It is currently headed by Khwaja Shamsuddin Azeemi since 1980.

Aims
The central rules of the Azeemi Spiritual Order are (as stated by the official website of the Azeemi Spiritual Order):

 To serve the Religion by remaining on the Straight Path.
 To strive to advance the Spiritual Mission of the Islamic prophet Mohammed after practicing his teachings truthfully.
 To serve the creatures of God.
 To invite the people to acquire the religious knowledge besides learning the spiritual and the modern sciences.
 To help people to have that thinking pattern through which they could be aware of their Soul and the Spiritual Potentials.
 To be sympathetic and courteous to everyone, as much as possible, irrespective of his caste, creed or color by considering the whole of mankind a family.

Regulations
The main regulations of the Azeemi Spiritual Order are:
To maintain their spiritual distinction and identity in everything said or done.
To advance in greeting irrespective of their age.
Be kind to the creatures of the Lord.
Avoid mutual differences in the Silsila.
Act upon every directive of the Spiritual Teacher (mentor) without having anything against it at heart.
Never try to prove the superiority of your Silsila by comparing it with any other Silsila, because all silasal are paths to reach God.
Anybody causing trouble or nuisance should be expelled from the Silsila.
Lessons for chanting and cogitating must be practiced with punctuality. Avoid carelessness in performing Muraqba.
Recite the Quran, giving due consideration to the meanings of the text studied.
Establish an affinity with God during performance of Salaat.
Spiritual Associate or a student of any other Silsila can be accepted in Silsila Azeemi as an apprentice (Talib).
Anybody who is already engaged in a silsila cannot be admitted to the Silsila Azeemi because it is the law that a person cannot have admissions in two spiritual orders simultaneously.
No one can break away after being admitted to the Silsila, therefore make no haste in getting admission to the Silsila. Anybody desirous of admission in the Silsila must be clearly told to carefully consider the option of taking admission because this bond is irrevocable.
People entrusted with a responsibility in the Silsila should not call anybody their disciple. They should treat them as friends and should address them as friend.
Anyone with authority in the Silsila should not ensconce on a seat of distinction particularly made for him. Appearance and seating in the public must be like an ordinary person.
Male, female, young and old; being the creative masterpieces of the Lord Creator are all brethren and sisters for one another with respect to Adam. Everyone is equal; nobody is superior or inferior to others. Superiority only befits him who enjoys the cognition of the ocean of the Attributes of God, who reflects the attributes of the Lord Creator, is helpful to his fellow beings and hurts nobody.
Don’t let any doubt enter into your heart. Anybody having dubiety cannot ever have cognition of the Lord. Doubt is the most powerful tool of Satan through which he takes man away from his soul. Getting away from the Spiritual Values closes all the gates of learning, self-realization and cognition.
A painter paints a picture. First of all, he enjoys the painting himself. How can anyone else be impressed with his painting if he himself is not satisfied with his own performance? Not only that the others will not be impressed with his efforts, but he will also be ridiculed. Thus, the painter would fall prey to restlessness, anxiety, and uneasiness. Therefore, do such things that you should be satisfied with them and don’t let your conscience grow dead. This is the secret for becoming a source of guidance to others.
Everyone should strive wholeheartedly and actively in the affairs of life, giving due consideration to the religious values, social and ethical and moral laws, without expecting desired results. Results should be left to God because man is only a toy in the hands of circumstances. Man is forced to live his life as the circumstances compel him. Indeed, God is Omnipotent and encompassing everything, He controls the circumstances and the situations can change as and when He desires so. Observing the moral, social and religious values is mandatory for everyone during the course of earning his livelihood.
If someone feels hurt because of you, apologize irrespective of the fact that he is older or younger than you, because greatness lies in submission and humiliation.
If you feel hurt because of someone, pardon him immediately because vengeance by itself is a vice. The vengeful emotions only help in wrecking the nerves.  The fire of anger produces vibrations in the blood of the person getting angry and his nerves lose their vital energy, to wit, the vital force of life is destroyed by causing harm to others. God does not like any harm coming to mankind. God says, “God loves those who control their anger.
Remember, the candle burns itself and sacrifices its life for others. The moths give up their lives as a tribute to the sacrifice of the candle.

Silsila-e-Azeemi invites the whole mankind to rally under the banner of “Hold tightly the rope of God united and don’t have differences amongst you." (Al-Quran)

The lineage of the Azeemi

Silsila Firdausia

 Najmuddin Kubra, Sheikh al-Kubra, A great Sheikh

Silsila Junaidia

  Abdul-Qasim Junaid Baghdadi

Silsila Malamatia

  Zul-Nun Misri
  Muhammad Sughra Taj-ud-din(The Torch of Religion)
  Sheikh Shahab-ud-din Suhrawardi, (Sheikh of Sheikhs)

Silsila Naqshbandiya

  Sheikh Baha al-Haqq Naqshbandi, Khwaja Baqi Allah

Silsila Nooriyya

 Syed Ahmed Mohiyuddin Noorishah Jeelani

Silsila Qadria

  Sheikh Abdul Qadir Jilani

Silsila Qalandariya

  Imam Musa al-Kazim
  Zul Nun Misri
  Sharf-ud-din bu Ali Shah Qalander 
  Muhammad Sughra Taj-ud-din

Silsila Suhrawardia

  Abdul-Qahir Abu Najib al-Suhrawardi
  Sheikh Shahab-ud-din Suhrawardi, Sheikh of Sheikhs
  Abul-Faiz Qalander Ali Suhrawardi (Great Hazrat Jee)
  Sheikh Baha al-Haqq wal-din Zakariya Tamtafi

Silsila Taifooria

  Bayazid Bistami

Silsila Tajia

  Muhammad Sughra Taj-ud-din (The Torch of Religion)

     Silsila e Chistia 
 Hazrat  (Mu'in al-Din Chishti) Khwaja Moinuddin Chishti a.s

Present
There are more than a hundred Azeemi centres (Muraqba Halls) throughout the world.

Silsila Azeemi strives to "promote the teachings of Mohammed so that our soul may find happiness and peace, and fulfill the purpose of our creation, which is to experience, and understand the ultimate reality by gaining spiritual knowledge of the highest form."

See also

Qalander Baba Auliya
Sufism
Baba Tajuddin of Nagpur

References
 azeemiasilsila.org

External links
Official Main Website
Australia Center Website
UK Center Website
Azeemia-ISB
iSeek.Online
Naseeb

Sufi orders